Peter or Pete Reynolds may refer to:

 Peter Reynolds (actor) (1921–1975), British actor
 Peter Reynolds (archaeologist) (1939–2001), British archaeologist
 Peter Reynolds (composer) (1958–2016), Welsh composer and creator of the opera Sands of Time
 Peter Reynolds (physicist), American physicist
 Peter Reynolds (rowing) (born 1937), British Olympic rower
 Peter Reynolds (swimmer) (1948–2012), Australian Olympic swimmer
 Peter H. Reynolds (born 1961), Canadian American author
 Pete Reynolds (1885–1951), American college football coach